Evening Ledger may refer to multiple newspapers or their evening editions:

Public Ledger (Philadelphia), Pennsylvania
The Ledger, in Lakewood, Florida, founded as Lakeland Evening Ledger
The Mexico Ledger, Mexico, Missouri, known as Mexico Evening Ledger (1886-1968)

See also
Ledger (disambiguation)